Steve Dawson is a Canadian guitarist, singer and music producer. Dawson has produced albums by Jim Byrnes, Kelly Joe Phelps, Old Man Luedecke, The Sojourners, and The Deep Dark Woods. He has won two Juno Awards. He frequently collaborates with keyboardist Chris Gestrin, bassist Keith Lowe and drummer Georr Hicks.  He has been a member of the duo Zubot & Dawson, and of the group The Great Uncles of the Revolution.

Career
In 2001 Dawson came together with Jesse Zubot Kevin Turcotte and Andrew Downing to release an album, Great Uncles of the Revolution Stand Up!. The album won a Western Music Award. In 2002 The Great Uncles of the Revolution performed at the Montreal Jazz Festival, and were presented with the Grand Prix de Jazz de Montreal.

He also won the Independent Canadian Music Award for Roots Album Of The Year twice, in 2000 and 2002.

Dawson continued to perform with the Great Uncles and with the duo Zubot & Dawson, who won a 2003 Juno Award for Roots/Traditional Group Album with their recording Chicken Scratch.

A second Great Uncles of the Revolution album, Blow the House Down, won a 2004 Juno Award for Contemporary Jazz Album of the Year. In 2007, 2008, and 2009 Dawson was named Producer of the Year at the Western Canadian Music Awards.

In 2005, 2006, and 2010 he won the Canadian Folk Music Award.  Dawson's album Nightshade appeared in Acoustic Guitar magazine's “Top 10 Guitar Albums of the Year - 2011”.

In 2012, Dawson released an album, Nightshade, through the label Black Hen Music.

References

External links
Steve Dawson Official website
 

Canadian guitarists
Canadian record producers
Canadian folk singers
Canadian male singers
Living people
Canadian male guitarists
Canadian Folk Music Award winners
Year of birth missing (living people)